James Craig (February 28, 1818 – October 22, 1888) was an American lawyer and politician from Saint Joseph, Missouri. He represented Missouri in the U.S. House from 1857 until 1861. He also served as an army Captain in the Mexican–American War.

During the American Civil War, Craig served as a brigadier general of U.S. volunteers. From April to November 1862, Craig was the military commander in charge of the overland mail routes in Kansas and Nebraska. On November 2, 1862 he assumed command of the District of Nebraska Territory and commanded until May 5, 1863 when he resigned. Craig again served as a brigadier general, this time in the Missouri State militia, in 1864 and 1865.

He is buried in Mount Mora Cemetery.

James Craig is the namesake of Craig, Missouri.

References

External links
 biographic sketch at U.S. Congress

1818 births
1888 deaths
People of Missouri in the American Civil War
Union Army generals
Democratic Party members of the United States House of Representatives from Missouri
19th-century American politicians